Geoffrey Osborne (born 24 February 1956) is a New Zealand former cricketer. He played two first-class and nine List matches for Otago between 1977 and 1982.

See also
 List of Otago representative cricketers

References

External links
 

1956 births
Living people
New Zealand cricketers
Otago cricketers
Cricketers from Dunedin